Health effects (or health impacts) are changes in health resulting from exposure to a source. Health effects are an important consideration in many areas, such as hygiene, pollution studies, occupational safety and health, ([nutrition]) and health sciences in general.  Some of the major environmental sources of health effects are air pollution, water pollution, soil contamination, noise pollution and over-illumination. 

A non-stochastic or deterministic health effect has a severity that is dependent on dose and is believed to have a threshold level for which no effect is seen. Stochastic health effects occur by chance, generally occurring without a threshold level of dose, whose probability is proportional to the dose and whose severity is independent of the dose, such as cancer and genetic effects. Occasionally, lack of exposure to certain effectors has detrimental consequences on an individual's health. Examples of such effectors include sunlight and exercise.

See also
 Health effects of alcohol
 Health effects of caffeine
 Health effects of pesticides
 Health effects of pollution
 Health effects of tobacco
Effects of the car on societies
 :Category:Radiation health effects
 Health#Determinants
 Material safety data sheet
 Risk factor
 Social determinants of health

Sources
Nuclear Regulatory Commission - Glossary

Effect
Environmental health
 
Pollution